John Broughton (born 1952) is an Australian astronomer.

John Broughton or Jack Broughton may also refer to:

Jack Broughton (1703 or 1704–1789), English boxer.
Jack Broughton (RAF officer), senior RAF officer in the 1970s and 1980s
Jacksel M. Broughton (1925–2014), career officer and fighter pilot in the US Air Force
John Broughton (cricketer) (1873–1952), English cricketer
John Broughton (dentist) (born 1947), New Zealand dental and Māori health academic, and playwright
John M. Broughton, British psychologist
John Broughton, author of Wikipedia – The Missing Manual